Rub is the sixth studio album by Canadian electronic musician Peaches. It was released on September 25, 2015 by I U She Music.

The album was produced by Vice Cooler with Peaches in her Los Angeles garage throughout 2013 and 2014. In June 2015 the album was announced to contain guest vocal appearances by Kim Gordon, Feist, and Simonne Jones.

Critical reception

On Metacritic, Rub received a score of 78 out of 100 from 12 critics, indicating "generally favorable reviews". Fiona Sturges of Uncut described the music on the album as "x-rated electro-pop".

Track listing
All tracks produced by Peaches and Vice Cooler; all tracks written by Peaches and Cooler, except where noted.

Personnel
 Phillip Broussard Jr. – engineer ("Sick in the Head")
 Camilla Camaglia – photography
 Vice Cooler – composer, producer, synthesizer, drums, percussion, sampler
 Feist – composer, featured artist ("I Mean Something")
 Kim Gordon – composer, featured artist ("Close Up")
 Jimmy Harry – composer, synthesizer ("Dumb Fuck")
 Simonne Jones – composer, featured artist ("Vaginoplasty")
 Daria Marchik – cover photo
 Mocky – synthesizer ("Rub")
 Mumbai Science – additional percussion ("Vaginoplasty")
 Nadine Neven – percussion, producer, synthesizer ("Light in Places")
 Cole Nystrom – assistant mixer
 Peaches – art direction, composer, design, primary artist, producer
 Dave Pensado – mixing
 Planningtorock – composer, vocal production ("Free Drink Ticket")
 Siriusmo – additional percussion ("Pickles")
 Dale Voelker – design

Charts

References

2015 albums
Peaches (musician) albums
XL Recordings albums